Charles Robert Williams (August 1, 1877 – October 17, 1957) was an American football coach and college athletics administrator.  Williams coached at South Carolina, Davidson, Clemson, and Virginia Tech.

Early years
Williams was born on August 1, 1877 in Bland, Virginia. He attended the University of Virginia, where he was an end on the football team.

Coaching career

South Carolina
Graduating in 1902, Williams served as the Gamecocks' mentor for two seasons, 1902 and 1903, achieving 6–1 and 8–2 records. In 1902, he oversaw an upset of the rival Clemson Tigers, who were coached by John Heisman. This was the only game lost by the Tigers that year.

Davidson
From 1904 to 1905 he coached at Davidson, where he compiled a 9–5–1 record.

Clemson
Williams came to Clemson in 1906. The Tigers went undefeated with a 4–0–3 record, with wins over Georgia, Auburn, Tennessee, and the John Heisman-coached Georgia Tech team. Clemson's first forward pass took place on November 29, 1906, during the game with Georgia Tech in Atlanta.  Left End Powell Lykes, dropped back to kick, but lobbed a 30-yard pass to George Warren instead.  Clemson won, 10–0.

VPI
Williams left for VPI for the 1907 season, leading them to a 7–2 record.

Returns to Clemson
Williams then returned to Clemson in 1909.  The 1909 season was notable for the resumption of the Clemson-Carolina rivalry after a five-year gap, caused by a near riot in October 1902. The Tigers enjoyed a 6–3 season under Williams' guidance and defeated the Gamecocks, 6–0, in Columbia on November 4.

Williams was replaced by Frank Dobson in 1910 who had a three-year run at the school, the first coach to actually have a signed contract. With Dobson's departure after the 1912 season, Williams returned for the second time to the Clemson head coaching position.  He, too, would serve for three years, 1913–1915.  The Tigers produced records of 4–4 in 1913, 5–3–1 in 1914, and 2–4–2 in 1915. In the 41 games that Williams coached in five seasons, he went 21–14–6, for a .585 winning percentage.

Between the years of 1915 and 1926, Williams practiced law in Roanoke, Virginia, and was the city's mayor.  He returned to coach Clemson for the final five games of the 1926 season.

Death
Williams died after a stroke in DeLand, Florida in 1957.

Head coaching record

Notes

References

Additional sources

Gaillard, Luther, "Clemson Handbook", The Wichita Eagle and Beacon Publishing Co., Wichita, Kansas, 1996, pages 9–10, .
Sahadi, Lou, "The Clemson Tigers - From 1896 to Glory", William Morrow and Company, Inc., New York, 1983, page 17, .

1877 births
1957 deaths
American football ends
Clemson Tigers athletic directors
Clemson Tigers football coaches
Davidson Wildcats football coaches
Virginia Cavaliers football coaches
Virginia Cavaliers football players
Virginia Tech Hokies football coaches
South Carolina Gamecocks athletic directors
South Carolina Gamecocks football coaches
Virginia lawyers
People from Bland County, Virginia
Sportspeople from Roanoke, Virginia
Coaches of American football from Virginia
Players of American football from Virginia